Averostra, or "bird snouts", is a clade that includes most theropod dinosaurs, namely Ceratosauria and Tetanurae, and represent the only group of post-Early Jurassic theropods. Both survived into the Cretaceous period. When the Cretaceous–Paleogene extinction event occurred, ceratosaurians, megaraptorans an incertae sedis group within Tetanurae, and two groups of tetanurans within the clade Coelurosauria, the Tyrannosauroidea and Maniraptoriformes, were still extant. Only one subgroup of Maniraptoriformes, Aves, survived the extinction event and persisted to the present day.

One important diagnostic feature of Averostra is the absence of the fifth metacarpal. Other saurischians retained this bone, albeit in a significantly reduced form.

Definition
Averostra was named by Gregory S. Paul in 2002 as an apomorphy-based clade defined as the group including the Dromaeosauridae and other Avepoda with (an ancestor with) a promaxillary fenestra (fenestra promaxillaris), an extra opening in the front outer side of the maxilla, the bone that makes up the upper jaw. It was later re-defined by Martin Ezcurra and Gilles Cuny in 2007 as a node-based clade containing Ceratosaurus nasicornis, Allosaurus fragilis, their last common ancestor and all its descendants. Mickey Mortimer commented that Paul's original apomorphy-based definition may make Averostra a much broader clade than the Ceratosaurus+Allosaurus node, potentially including all of Avepoda or more.

The clade formed by Ceratosauria and Tetanurae while excluding Coelophysoidea was first named Neotheropoda by Bakker (1986), but this name was later used by most authors for a clade that also contains Coelophysoidea and is similar in content to Avepoda.

A 2020 monograph supported the classification of very early large Jurassic theropods such as Dilophosaurus as not members of Averostra (as defined by Ezcurra and Cuny), but related to basal members.

References

Neotheropods
Taxa named by Gregory S. Paul